Hydroelectricity in Ukraine is quite developed branch of power engineering. State operating company is Ukrhydroenergo and Energoatom.

General characteristics 

In the energy sector of Ukraine, hydroelectric power plants occupy the third place after thermal (coal and natural gas) and  atomic energy. The total installed capacity of the Ukrainian hydroelectric power stations is currently 8% of the total capacity of the combined energy system of the country. The average annual output of electric power by hydroelectric power stations is 10.8 billion kWh. The economic and technical potential of the hydropower resources of Ukraine comprises about 20 billion kWh, and  no more than 50% is used. The main used potential is concentrated on the hydroelectric power stations of the  Dnipro cascade (capacity - 3.8 GW, output - 9.9 GWh • h): Dnieper Hydroelectric Station, Kyiv Pumped Storage Power Plant (HPSP), Tashlyk HPSP.

In addition to hydroelectric power plants (HPP) and HPS, 49 so-called small hydroelectric plants operate in Ukraine, producing more than 200 million kWh of electricity. But they have drawbacks: rapid wear of equipment, damage to the structures of a pressure fountain, drainage of reservoirs, insufficient use of means of automation and control.

The main cascades of hydroelectric power stations are the Dnipro cascade and the  Dniester cascade.

Also there are some unfinished projects on the Southern Bug like  (430 MW)

On Tashlyk Pumped-Storage Power Plant, a third unit is under construction.

Largest stations

Small stations

See also 
 Energy in Ukraine
 Renewable energy in Ukraine

References 
 Сучасний стан, проблеми та перспективи розвитку гідроенергетики України : аналіт. доп. / О. М. Суходоля, А. А. Сидоренко, С. В. Бєгун, А. А. Білуха ; [за заг. ред. О. М. Суходолі] ; Нац. ін-т стратег. дослідж. – Київ : НІСД, 2014. – 112 с. : табл. – (Серія "Національна безпека" ; вип. 8). – Бібліогр.: с. 87-88 (9 назв). –